Josh Watson may refer to:
 Josh Watson (swimmer)
 Josh Watson (American football)

See also
 Joshua Watson, English wine merchant and philanthropist